TinTin++ is a MUD client primarily written for Unix-like systems. It is one of the oldest MUD clients in existence and a successor of the TINTIN client. TINTIN stands for "The kIckiN Tickin dIkumud clieNt" though its author admits this to be a backronym.

About 

TinTin++ is a console Telnet client enhanced with features that work particularly well for playing MUDs, though it allows connecting to Linux and Bulletin Board System servers as well.  To enhance game play on MUDs, the client can create a split screen arrangement, which divides the interface into input, output, and status areas. Input handling is enhanced with readline-like input editing, macro, and alias support. Text received from the server can be highlighted or set to execute triggers written in the TINTIN scripting language, which resembles the C programming language.

TinTin++ has various other features that are commonly found in modern MUD clients, such as automapping, MCCP, friend-to-friend messaging, logging in HTML, and a Telnet event handler.

History 

TINTIN originated as a single file containing 700 lines of C code, allowing triggers and aliases, that was posted on Usenet by Peter Unold on April 1, 1992. On October 6, 1992, Peter Unold made his final release, TINTIN III.

In 1993 the development of TINTIN was continued by Bill Reiss who announced the release of TinTin++ v1.0 on July 3, 1993. On April 25, 1994, TinTin++ 1.5 was announced, which was a joint effort by Bill Reiss, David A. Wagner, Rob Ellsworth, and Jeremy C. Jack.

After the 1.5 release in 1994 active development came to a halt. TinTin++ 1.5 had gained significant popularity however, and being public domain this resulted in many derivative works like zMUD, yTin, Lyntin, Pueblo, WinTin95, and GGMud. In 1998 development was continued briefly by Rob Elsworth who incorporated several patches by Sverre Normann before handing over development to Davin Chan who re-licensed the software to GNU GPL on July 12, 2001, in his final release of TinTin++ 1.86b.

In 2004 development was continued by Igor van den Hoven.

Distribution 

TinTin++ is currently distributed under the GNU General Public License, and the source code can be compiled on most Unix-like operating systems including Mac OS X. A port for Microsoft Windows called WinTin++ bundles TinTin++ with the mintty terminal emulator.

See also
 Comparison of MUD clients

References

External links
 TinTin++ MUD client home page
 TinTin++ 1.5 Manual

MUD clients
Free network-related software
Free software programmed in C